Neil Sweeney (born 9 September 1977) is an Australian former professional rugby league footballer who played in the 2000s.

Early life
Sweeney was born in Newcastle, New South Wales, Australia. He was raised in the Lake Macquarie Suburb of Teralba and attended local primary and high schools.

Playing career
Sweeney made his first grade debut against Penrith in Round 19 2002 scoring two tries.  Sweeney joined North Queensland in 2003 and played for the club over the next 5 seasons but did not feature in the club's first ever finals campaign in 2004 nor the 2005 NRL grand final against the Wests Tigers.

References

Sources

External links
Sweeney at Cowboys.com.au

1977 births
Living people
Australian rugby league players
Newcastle Knights players
North Queensland Cowboys players
Rugby league wingers
Rugby league players from Newcastle, New South Wales